Project Arts Centre is a multidisciplinary arts centre based in Temple Bar, Dublin, which hosts visual arts, theatre, dance, music, and performance.

History
Project Arts Centre was founded by Jim FitzGerald and Colm O'Briain in 1967 after a three-week festival at the Gate Theatre in 1966.  Project Arts Centre was the first such arts centre in Ireland. The Centre had several homes before it opened for business in a converted factory on East Essex Street in 1975, after numerous issues regarding funding. This building was demolished in 1998 and a new purpose-built space containing two auditoriums, a gallery and a bar opened on the same site in 2000, as part of the second phase of the regeneration of Temple Bar. The presence of the Centre, along with a number of other cultural institutions in Temple Bar such as  Irish Film Institute, the Temple Bar Gallery and Studios, Black Church Print Studios, the Gallery of Photography, and
Temple Bar Music Centre (now the Button Factory), inspired the regeneration of the area as a cultural quarter.

The Centre

The centre has been a venue for many of the city's performing arts festivals including Dublin Dance Festival, Dublin Writers Festival, Dublin Fringe Festival and Dublin Theatre Festival. Since the Irish recession there has been an emphasis on cross cultural productions.

In 2018, street artist Maser painted a mural in support of the Repeal the 8th 'pro-choice' campaign, but the Centre was pressured by the Irish Government to paint over it.

References

External links
 Project Arts Centre's website

Art museums and galleries in the Republic of Ireland
Arts in Dublin (city)
Buildings and structures in Dublin (city)
Arts centres in the Republic of Ireland
Contemporary art galleries in Ireland
Tourist attractions in Dublin (city)